Shoe Lane may refer to:

Shoe Lane, a passage off Fleet Street, in the City of London, once the site of a workhouse
Shoe Lane, an alley leading from New Inn Hall Street, Oxford, to the Clarendon Shopping Centre